"Girls Like Us" is a song by UK garage duo B-15 Project featuring Crissy D and Lady G on vocals. Based on Crissy D and Lady G's song "Girls Like Us" from the dancehall compilation album Oracabessa One (1998), the song was a top-10 hit in the UK, peaking at number seven on the UK Singles Chart. It also reached number one on the UK Dance Singles Chart and number 22 in the Netherlands. Mixmag included "Girls Like Us" in their list of "40 of the best UK garage tracks released from 1995 to 2005", while Gemtracks included the song in their list of the "top UK garage songs between 1995–2005".

Track listings

UK CD single
 "Girls Like Us" (original radio edit)
 "Girls Like Us" (original full length version)
 "Girls Like Us" (Artful Dodger remix)
 "Girls Like Us" (Sharp 'House Rage' remix)
 "Girls Like Us" (CD ROM video and hyperlink)

UK cassette single
 "Girls Like Us" (radio edit)
 "Girls Like Us" (full length version)
 "Girls Like Us" (Artful Dodger remix)
 "Girls Like Us" (Sharp 'House Rage' remix)

UK 12-inch single
A1. "Girls Like Us" (original full length version)
A2. "Girls Like Us" (Artful Dodger remix)
B1. "Girls Like Us" (Zed Bias remix)
B2. "Girls Like Us" (Sharp 'House Rage' remix)

Charts

References

2000 songs
2000 singles
Relentless Records singles
UK garage songs